Squalius alburnoides is a species of fish in the family Cyprinidae. It is found in Portugal and Spain. Its natural habitats are rivers and intermittent rivers. It may be threatened by habitat loss.

This species is a highly peculiar fish in regard to its evolution and reproduction. It has been derived from hybridisation between females of Squalius pyrenaicus and males of another, unknown cyprinid species, and maintains the genomes of both parental species. Squalius alburnoides may have various numbers of these genomes (polyploidy), and may use different reproductive modes to pass them on to the offspring, including asexual reproduction, normal meiosis and hybridogenesis. It has the first confirmed instance of natural androgenesis in a vertebrate, where an individual inherits only genes from the father.

References

External links
 

Cyprinid fish of Europe
Endemic fish of the Iberian Peninsula
Fish hybrids
Fish described in 1866
Squalius
Taxonomy articles created by Polbot
Taxobox binomials not recognized by IUCN